The 2005 Grand Prix Hassan II was an Association of Tennis Professionals men's tennis tournament played on outdoor clay courts in Casablanca, Morocco. It was the 21st edition of the tournament and was held from 4 April until 11 April 2005. Sixth-seeded Mariano Puerta won the singles title.

Finals

Singles

 Mariano Puerta defeated  Juan Mónaco 6–4, 6–1
 It was Puerta's only title of the year and the 6th of his career.

Doubles

 František Čermák /  Leoš Friedl defeated  Martín García /  Luis Horna 6–4, 6–3
 It was Čermák's 3rd title of the year and the 8th of his career. It was Friedl's 3rd title of the year and the 8th of his career.

External links
 ATP tournament profile

 
Grand Prix Hassan II
Grand Prix Hassan II